Christiane Charlotte of Nassau-Ottweiler (2 September 1685 – 6 November 1761) was a Countess of Nassau-Ottweiler by birth and by marriage successively Countess of Nassau-Saarbrücken and countess of Hesse-Homburg.

Life 

Christiane Charlotte was a daughter of the Count Frederick Louis of Nassau-Ottweiler (1651–1728) from his first marriage with Countess Christiane of Ahlefeldt (1659–1695).

She married her first husband, Count Charles Louis of Nassau-Saarbrücken, on 22 April 1713 in Saarbrücken:

She closed her second marriage on 17 October 1728 in Saarbrücken with Landgrave Frederick III of Hesse-Homburg.  This marriage came into existence after mediation by Frederick's brother, Landgrave Ernest Louis of Hesse-Darmstadt.  This marriage should consolidate the ailing finances of Hesse-Homburg.  An imperial debit commission had found only two silver spoons at the court.  Frederick III had raised concerns and proposed to inform his bride-to-be, who demanded a proper dower, about his financial situation.  Ernest Louis then wrote to Frederick : "Write brother, write, as long as you have time, you can do so."

Issue 
From her first marriage, Christiane Charlotte had two sons, who, however, both died in infancy:
 Charles Frederick (1718–1719)
 Louis Charles (1720–1721)

References 
 Carl Eduard Vehse: Geschichte der deutschen Höfe seit der Reformation, p. 453.

Countesses of Nassau
House of Nassau
Landgravines of Hesse-Darmstadt
1685 births
1761 deaths
18th-century German people
Daughters of monarchs
Remarried royal consorts